Axel Elmlund (1838-1901), was a Swedish ballet dancer and stage actor.

He was the son of the shoemaker Sven Axel Elmlund and Christina Dorothea Wilhelmina Björkman. He never married.

He was a student of the Royal Swedish Ballet at the Royal Swedish Opera in 1850-55, a figurant dancer in 1855-58, and a pantomime dancer in 1858-61. He was a recognized for his ability as a dancer by August Bournonville, who reportedly lamented Elmlund's choice to interrupt a promising career as a dancer to retrain as an actor instead.

In 1856, he became a student actor at the Royal Dramatic Theatre, where he was engaged in 1858-1891 - from 1864 as a premier actor. He was also active as a stage director.

Axel Elmlund attracted attention for his handsome appearance and his physical control and body language onstage, an advantage from his ballet training.  Within just a couple of years after his debut he became a member of the theatre's elite actors and was particularly appreciated for his roles as a hero in romantic tragedies.  The nature of such roles did however result in a decline of his career during his later years onstage. He retired in 1891 and was able to live comfortably on his income.

References 

 Nordensvan, Georg, Svensk teater och svenska skådespelare från Gustav III till våra dagar. Andra delen, 1842-1918, Bonnier, Stockholm, 1918 ['Swedish theatre and Swedish actors from Gustav III to our days. Second Book 1822–1918'] (in Swedish)

1838 births
1901 deaths
19th-century Swedish ballet dancers
19th-century Swedish male actors
Swedish male stage actors
Royal Swedish Ballet dancers